Templeheart Films is a British independent film investment and production company.

History
The company was founded in 2008 by Lyndon Baldock. Since its formation, Templeheart has been involved in the  finance, development and production of over  thirty feature films and in the British Film Institute's Statistical Yearbook (2015) was ranked eighth highest in the list of UK production companies. The company has a range of UK and US productions and aims to invest in emerging talent, while encouraging financiers to join the film industry.

Films (Co-Produced) 
 Ibiza Undead (2016)
 Being Keegan (2016)
 Heretiks (2016)
 The London Firm (2016)
 Devil's Tower (2014)
 Deadly Virtues:Love, Honour, Obey (2014)
 He Who Dares (2014)
 Shame the Devil (2013)
 White Collar Hooligan 2: England Away (2013)
 My Bloody BFF: the Making of Deranged (2013) 
 The Zombie King (2013)
 The Warning (2012) 
 Riot (2012) 
 The Seasoning House (2012)
 The Rise and Fall of a White Collar Hooligan (2012)
 Airborne (2012)
 Deranged (2012)
 The Hooligan Wars (2012)
 How to Stop Being a Loser (2011)
 The Reverend (2011)
 Jack Falls (2011) 
 Risen (2010)

References

External links
 Templeheart at BFI
 Templeheart at IMDb

Film production companies of the United Kingdom